The Mirror of Justices, also known in Anglo-Norman as Le mireur a justices and in Latin as Speculum Justitiariorum, is a law textbook of the early 14th century, written in Anglo-Norman French by Andrew Horn (or Horne). The original manuscript is in the Parker Library, Corpus Christi College, Cambridge (manuscript identifier CCCC MS 258).

The work was published in 1642, based on a copy owned by Francis Tate and the Cambridge manuscript. In 1646 it was translated into English and printed together with Anthony Fitzherbert's The Diversity of Courts and their Jurisdictions. This version was republished in 1659 and 1768. In 1895 the Selden Society published an edition of the work containing the Anglo-Norman text with a parallel English translation, and an extensive introduction by Frederic William Maitland.

See also
Norman yoke

References

 

13th-century manuscripts
Anglo-Norman literature